The 1963–64 season was the 8th season of the Liga Nacional de Baloncesto. Real Madrid won the title.

Teams and venues

First stage

Group A

League table

Group B

League table

Final stage

League table

Relegation playoffs 
Teams qualified between 4th and 6th played the relegation playoffs. Only two teams remained in the league: Canoe NC and CD Mataró.

Stats Leaders

Points

References

External links 
 ACB.com 
 Linguasport 

Liga Española de Baloncesto (1957–1983) seasons
1963–64 in Spanish basketball